Ghizzano is a village in Tuscany, central Italy,  administratively a frazione of the comune of Peccioli, province of Pisa. At the time of the 2001 census its population was 312.

Ghizzano is about 45 km from Pisa and 9 km from Peccioli.

References 

Frazioni of the Province of Pisa